Kenneth France (22 February 1941 – 30 August 2019) was an association football player who represented New Zealand at international level.

France made his full All Whites debut as a substitute in a 3–1 win over Singapore on 8 November 1967  and ended his international playing career with five A-international caps to his credit, his final cap an appearance in a 0–0 draw with Iran on 12 August 1973.

References 

1941 births
2019 deaths
New Zealand association footballers
New Zealand international footballers
Association footballers not categorized by position